The Parodiellaceae are a family of fungi with an uncertain taxonomic placement in the class Dothideomycetes. It contains the single genus Parodiella, which has four species.

References

Pleosporales
Dothideomycetes families
Taxa named by Margaret Elizabeth Barr-Bigelow
Taxa described in 1987